The West Coast Hotshots were a basketball team based in Bend, Oregon. The Hotshots played in the International Basketball League (IBL).

The team was founded in 2005 as the Central Oregon Hotshots. The team name was changed in 2010 to West Coast Hotshots.

The Hotshots played one game in the 2012 IBL season and then did not return in 2013.

References

External links
2007 website
IBL page

International Basketball League teams
Sports in Bend, Oregon
Basketball teams established in 2005
2005 establishments in Oregon
Defunct basketball teams in Oregon
2012 disestablishments in Oregon
Basketball teams disestablished in 2012